Local elections were held in the province of Bulacan on May 13, 2013, as part of the 2013 general election.  Voters will select candidates for all local positions: a town mayor, vice mayor and town councilors, as well as members of the Sangguniang Panlalawigan, the vice-governor, governor and representatives for the four districts of Bulacan.

Provincial Elections
The candidates for governor and vice governor with the highest number of votes wins the seat; they are voted separately, therefore, they may be of different parties when elected.

Incumbent Governor Wilhelmino Sy-Alvarado of NUP is running for his reelection unopposed, his running mate is Incumbent Vice Governor and Actor Daniel Fernando.

Candidates for Governor
Parties are as stated in their certificate of candidacies.

Incumbent Wilhelmino Sy-Alvarado is running unopposed

Candidates for Vice-Governor
Parties are as stated in their certificate of candidacies.

Congressional Election
Each of Bulacan's four legislative districts will elect each representative to the House of Representatives. The candidate with the highest number of votes wins the seat.

1st District
Ma. Victoria Sy-Alvarado is the incumbent.

 
 
 
 
 
 -->

2nd District
Incumbent Pedro Pancho is term limited; his son Gavini is his party's nominee.

Independent candidate Pancho Ordanes withdrew his candidacy.

 
 
 
 
 
 
 
 
 -->

3rd District
Joselito Mendoza is the incumbent.

4th District
Linabelle Villarica is the incumbent.
m

San Jose del Monte
Arthur Robes is the incumbent.

Sangguniang Panlalawigan Elections
All 4 Districts of Bulacan will elect Sangguniang Panlalawigan or provincial board members. The first (including Malolos) and fourth (including San Jose del Monte) districts sends three board members each, while the second and third districts sends two board members each. Election is via plurality-at-large voting; a voter can vote up to the maximum number of board members his district is sending.

1st District

|-bgcolor=black
|colspan=8|

|-

|-

2nd District

|-

|-

3rd District

|-

|-

4th District

|-

|-

City and Municipal Elections
All cities and municipalities of Bulacan will elect mayor and vice-mayor this election. The candidates for mayor and vice mayor with the highest number of votes wins the seat; they are voted separately, therefore, they may be of different parties when elected. Below is the list of mayoralty candidates of each city and municipalities per district.

1st District
City: Malolos
Municipalities:  Bulacan, Calumpit, Hagonoy, Paombong, Pulilan

City of Malolos
Christian Natividad is the incumbent, his opponent is former mayor Danilo Domingo.

Bulakan
Patrick Meneses is the incumbent.

Calumpit
James P. De Jesus (The Brother of Jess P. De Jesus) is the incumbent mayor.

Hagonoy
Angel Cruz, Jr. is the incumbent.

Paombong
Incumbent Donato Marcos withdrew his candidacy, he was substitute by his wife Maryanne Marcos. Her opponent is councilor Gani Castro.

Pulilan
Incumbent Vicente Esguerra running for his third and final term unopposed and independent.

2nd District
Municipalities: Balagtas, Baliuag, Bocaue, Bustos, Guiguinto, Pandi, Plaridel

Balagtas
Romeo Castro is the incumbent. his opponent is Gina Estrella of UNA.

Baliuag
Incumbent Romeo Estrella is term-limited, Provincial league of Barangays President Ferdie Estrella is his party's nominee.

Bocaue

Jon-Jon Villanueva is the incumbent, his main opponents are vice mayor Jose Santiago, Jr. and former mayor Serafin Dela Cruz.

Bustos
Arnel Mendoza is the incumbent, he will face again former mayor Carlito Reyes, on 2010 election Mendoza defeated Reyes with margin of 3442.

Guiguinto
Isagani Pascual is the incumbent, his opponent is former mayor Ambrosio Cruz, Jr.

Pandi
Enrico Roque is the incumbent, his opponent is vice mayor Rachel Oca. Rachel is widow of former mayor Roberto Oca.

It was alleged that Dra. Rachel Santos Oca's Legal team have some proof of election vote-buying violations. Voters were allegedly required to wear yellow baller by the one who was the recipient of this vote-buying activity. Pandi is known for rampant vote-buying activities in the past elections but just like what the Honorable current COMELEC head said, not a single violator has been imprisoned yet in any of this democratic processes.

Plaridel
Incumbent Anastacia Vistan is term-limited, her daughter Jocell Vistan is her party's nominee. her main opponent is vice mayor Leo Yap.

3rd District
Municipalities: Angat, Doña Remedios Trinidad, Norzagaray, San Ildefonso, San Miguel, San Rafael

Angat
Gilberto Santos is the incumbent, his opponent is former mayor Leonardo De Leon.

Doña Remedios Trinidad
Ronaldo Flores is the incumbent, his opponent is Pangko Sembrano.

Norzagaray
Fel Legaspi is the incumbent, his opponent is Alfredo "Fred" De Guzman Germar.

San Ildefonso
Incumbent Carla Paula Galvez-Tan withdrew her candidacy to give way to her father former mayor Edgardo Galvez, former mayor Edgardo Galvez opponent is his nephew Gerald Galvez. Gerald is son of former mayor Gener Galvez, former mayor Gener is brother of Edgardo Galvez.

San Miguel
Roderick Tiongson is the incumbent, his opponent is Brgy. Sta. Ines Captain John "Bong" Alvarez.

San Rafael
Lorna Silverio is the incumbent, her opponent is vice mayor Goto Viologo.

4th District
Cities: Meycauayan, 
Municipalities: Marilao, Obando, Santa Maria

Marilao

Incumbent Epifanio Guillermo is term-limited, his party nominate vice mayor Tito Santiago. his opponents is Henry Lutao and Ruperto Montaos, Jr.

Meycauayan City
Joan Alarilla is the incumbent, his opponent is former vice mayor Salvador Violago, Sr. on 2010 election. Alarilla defeated Violago with a margin of 10493 votes.

Obando
Orencio Gabriel is the incumbent, his opponents are vice mayor Danilo De Ocampo and Edwin Santos. on 2010 election Gabriel defeated Santos with a margin of 7857 votes.

Santa Maria
Bartolome Ramos is the incumbent, his opponent is Rogelio Barcial.

San Jose del monte City
Reynaldo San Pedro is the incumbent, his main opponents are former mayor Angelito Sarmiento and Rida Robes, the wife of incumbent Congressman Arthur Robes.

Elections in Bulacan
2013 Philippine local elections